Jeonggwa is a crispy, chewy hangwa (traditional Korean confection) with vivid colors and a translucent look. It can be made by boiling sliced fruits, roots, or seeds in honey, mullyeot (rice syrup), or sugar water, then drying the slices, and optionally shaping them into flowers or other decorative forms. The candied fruits, roots, or seeds may have the similar texture to jam, marmalade, or jelly.

Types 
Common ingredients include yuja, quinces, apricots, lotus roots, radishes, carrots, ginseng, balloon flower roots, gingers, burdock roots, bamboo shoots, and winter melons. If water is boiled first with honey (and often with spices such as cinnamon and ginger) and dried fruit is added later, it is called sujeonggwa ("water jeonggwa") and served cold as a beverage.

Miljeonggwa 

 Aengdu-jeonggwa – candied Korean cherry
 Boksunga-jeonggwa – candied peach
 Cheongmae-jeonggwa – candied green Korean plum
 Cheonmundong-jeonggwa – candied Chinese asparagus
 Dallae-jeonggwa – candied Korean wilde chive
 Danggeun-jeonggwa – candied carrot
 Deuljjuk-jeonggwa – candied bog bilberry
 Donga-jeonggwa – candied winter melon
 Doraji-jeonggwa – candied balloon flower root
 Gyul-jeonggwa – candied citrus fruit
 Haengin-jeonggwa – candied apricot kernel
 Hyangseolgo – candied munbae
 Insam-jeonggwa – candied Korean ginseng
 Juksun-jeonggwa – candied bamboo shoot
 Meoru-jeonggwa – candied crimson grapevine berry
 Mogwa-jeonggwa – candied Chinese quince
 Saenggang-jeonggwa – candied ginger
 Salgu-jeonggwa – candied apricot
 Yeongeun-jeonggwa – candied lotus root
 Yuja-jeonggwa – candied yuja

Sujeonggwa 
 Sujeonggwa ("cinnamon punch")

Gallery

See also 
 Gwapyeon
 Suksilgwa

References 

Hangwa